Pteridomyces is a genus of corticioid fungi in the family Atheliaceae.

References

External links

Atheliales
Taxa named by Walter Jülich
Fungi described in 1979